Bi Feiyu (born 1964) is a Chinese writer. His works are known for their complex portrayal of the "female psyche." He has won some of the highest literary awards in China. He also wrote the screenplay for Zhang Yimou's 1996 film Shanghai Triad.

Biography
Bi was born in Xinghua, Jiangsu Province in 1964. His name Feiyu means "one who flies across the universe". He lives in Nanjing.

Critical reception
Feiyu's novel The Moon Opera, translated by Howard Goldblatt, was longlisted for the 2008 Independent Foreign Fiction Prize, while Three Sisters, also translated by Goldblatt, won the 2010 Man Asian Literary Prize. In China, his awards include twice winning the Lu Xun Literary Prize; and the 2011 Mao Dun Prize, the highest national literary award, for Massage.

Selected works in translation

Awards
In 2011, Bi Feiyu won the Mao Dun Literary Prize for his novel Massage, one of the most prestigious literature prizes in China.

On August 21, 2017, the French Ministry of Culture awarded the Ordre des Arts et des Lettres to Bi Feiyu at the General Consulate of France in Shanghai.

References

1964 births
Living people
Writers from Taizhou, Jiangsu
International Writing Program alumni
Mao Dun Literature Prize laureates
Chinese male novelists
People's Republic of China novelists
20th-century Chinese novelists
21st-century Chinese novelists
20th-century Chinese male writers
21st-century male writers
People from Xinghua, Jiangsu